The Buick Limited was Buick's flagship model line between 1936 and 1942, and, in celebration of GM's Fiftieth Anniversary, a single-year halo car for the Division in model year 1958. Since the 1960s Buick has intermittently used the term "Limited" as a designation denoting its highest level of trim and standard features in its various model ranges. 

The original line given the Limited nameplate, topped by an extended-wheelbase limousine, was in direct competition with Cadillac senior sedans for clientele, which wanted a GM luxury car but regarded Cadillac as "ostentatious" or "flamboyant" in contrast to Buick's reputation for durable, reliable, and staid premium vehicles.

Buick Series 90 (1931-1935)

Buick's top platform was introduced in 1931 as the Series 90, using the GM "C-body" platform shared with the Cadillac Series 355. It featured a  Buick Straight-8 engine OHV engine, developing 104 bhp of power at 2,800 rpm. A premium luxury car, it was intended to compete with the advanced Cadillac V8, the exclusive straight-8 Packard Standard Eight, and other top U.S. marques.

Closed cars came with mohair velvet interiors, retractable silk passenger compartment shades, and wool carpeting throughout. Roadsters, Phaetons and convertibles came standard with leather interior. Retail prices for the 7-passenger Limousine were US$2,035 ($ in  dollars ). The Series 90 offered nearly the same refinement and attention to detail as Cadillac, but lacked its more modern, more powerful engine, while having a more advanced overhead valve train than the Packard's aging flathead design. Standard coachwork for Buick was exclusively supplied by Fisher Body, and rolling chassis were available to coachbuilders.  

The next year the size grew and a new high performance engine was introduced developing 113 hp. In 1933 all GM cars received an updated "streamlined" look produced by the corporation's Art and Color Studio headed by Harley Earl. In 1934 the running board was shortened and engine output increased to 116 hp. In 1935 the appearance alone was updated.  Total sales for the line was 43,321. In 1936 the model changed its name to "90 Limited".

Buick Limited (1936-1942)

The origins of the Limited name date to 1936 when Buick added names to its entire model lineup to celebrate the engineering improvements and design advancements over their 1935 models. It shared its chassis with the top-level Cadillac Series 70 vehicles. Buick had released a new line of cars that were technically superior to their predecessors by offering such features as all-steel passenger compartment tops (GM's Turret Top design), improved front suspension, improved hydraulic safety braking system, alloy engine pistons and an improved engine cooling system.

In 1939, Buick products underwent a substantial redesign; however, the Limited's "limited" production merited it to continue using its 1938 body. The 1939 Limited offered a sectioned rear compartment separating the driver from the rear passengers, and a glass partition could be raised to provide privacy. AM radios were first offered as an option.

Behind the scenes, Cadillac executives lobbied to get the Limited out of production because it infringed on their market. While it was priced in the lower end of its Fleetwood series price point, the Limited was listed at US$2,453 ($ in  dollars ) almost equaled Cadillac's factory built Imperial Touring Limousine, which cost almost four times as much as the Buick, in its appointments. Buick executives asserted that Limited production averaged only 1,561 vehicles per year for model years 1938 through 1940, an insignificant amount compared to Cadillac's production of its senior cars.

For 1940 Buick renamed some of its Series designations and gave names instead. Buick's Series 40 was named the Special, the Series 50 became the Super, the Series 60 was named the Century, the Series 70 was named the Roadmaster, and the Limited was given both the Series 80 and Series 90, with the Series 90 given to a limousine with a  wheelbase and 8-passenger capacity.

All Limiteds were built at the Buick factory in Flint, Michigan, while all Cadillacs were built in Detroit at the Clark Street Facility while coachwork was provided by Fisher Body.
 
Production of the Limited, and all Buick continued until the eve of World War II when the last Buick was built February 2, 1942. Following World War II, Buick dropped its extended wheelbase models, and cancelled the Series 90 Limited nameplate. The name Limited was truly appropriate to the cars themselves which were limited to touring sedans and limousines; its sales too were the smallest of Buick's entire model range:

1958 Limited 

The Buick Limited series was revived in 1958 as the ultimate Buick for the model year, using the GM C platform. In a model year where General Motors's answer to Chrysler's "Forward Look" was to update its 1957 Buicks and Oldsmobiles by slathering them in excessive amounts of chrome, the 1958 Buicks received the ultimate treatment. The 1958 models shared a common appearance on the top models for each brand; Cadillac Eldorado Seville, Buick Limited Riviera, Oldsmobile 98, Pontiac Bonneville Catalina, and the Chevrolet Bel-Air Impala

Each Buick Special, Century, Super and Roadmaster received a Fashion-Aire Dynastar grille, cast of 160 chrome squares, each, according to Buick PR pieces, "shaped in a design to maximize the amount of reflective light". Buick also added quad headlights and three emblems bearing a stylized "V", one a medallion on the hood and the other two as gun-sight fender-toppers. The Buick "Sweepspear" side trim, a styling hallmark since 1949, was joined by broad chrome panels attached to the rear quarter panels. Tail lights were housed in massive chrome housings; each trunk lid received a chrome grip in the center.

In comparison to the junior models in the Buick lineup, the Limited was slightly more restrained. Each Limited traded its chromed side panel trim for a body color-keyed insert decorated with fifteen slanted hash marks (three groups of five). The Limited also received its own rear tail treatment that traded the heavy chrome tail light housings for a wraparound tail light lens broken up by four chrome bands. Rear bumper "Dagmars" housed "Dual Jet" back-up lights. Power brakes were standard.

Available only as a 4-door hardtop, 2-door hardtop coupe or convertible, the Limited rode Buick's  wheelbase, with its body stretched , just shy of nineteen feet in length. Inside, buyers were treated to high quality fabrics in sedans and coupes, full leather in convertibles.

Buick sold only 7,438 Limiteds, due in part to their price. The Limited's four-door hardtop sedan started at a base price of $5,112, ($ in  dollars ) which was $221 ($ in  dollars ) higher than Cadillac's extended deck Series 62 four-door hardtop sedan at $4,891  ($ in  dollars ) of which Cadillac sold 13,335 units.

For the 1959 model year, Buick renamed its entire lineup, with the Super becoming the Invicta, the Roadmaster becoming the Electra 225 and the Limited being discontinued due to lack of sales success.

Limited trim package 
The Limited name was used again in 1967 as a trim option on the Electra 225 Custom model and other models.
Between 1971-1979, Buick added the "Limited" name to its top trim Electra 225, which was previously known as the Electra 225 Custom. The cars were not badged as Electra 225s, but instead wore "Limited" scripts. However, these cars were Electra 225s, and in a break from tradition, the "Limited" trim level could be optioned with either the Park Avenue or Park Avenue DeLuxe options package, each even more well-equipped than the Limited model alone.

Buick continued to use the designation of "Limited" through 2005 on its various models to typically denote the highest trim level in a model range.

References

External links 
 King of the Road

Limited
Cars introduced in 1936
Motor vehicles manufactured in the United States